Angus Eve (born 23 February 1972) is a Trinidadian former professional footballer who is the head coach of the Trinidad and Tobago national team since 2021. With 117 caps he is his country's most capped player of all time.

Playing career
Eve played with Joe Public of Trinidad, on loan from Chester City of England. Eve is Chester's most capped player, although many of his caps were won while out on loan and he only made 14 Football League appearances for Chester in the 1999–2000 season. They were relegated at the end of the season, with Eve missing several games because of international duty.

Eve made his debut for the Trinidad and Tobago national team in a 4 April 1994 Copa Caribe game against Barbados. He went on to become a monumental figure for the national team.  He earned 117 caps in those years, scoring 34 goals, and helped lead the team in three different rounds of World Cup qualifiers. He retired from international football after not being considered for the Trinidad and Tobago squad for the 2006 FIFA World Cup.

Eve joined San Juan Jabloteh prior to the 2001 Trinidad season as a defender.

Managerial career
Eve was an assistant coach at San Juan Jabloteh, working with former England international Terry Fenwick. In April 2009 he joined Ma Pau Stars as the assistant coach.

On 26 May 2011, he was appointed manager for the Trinidad and Tobago U23 for the Olympic Qualifiers that were played in July 2011.

On 15 June 2021, he was appointed interim head coach of the Trinidad and Tobago national team following the dismissal of Fenwick who failed to guide the team past the first round of the 2022 FIFA World Cup qualification. He was officially named head coach of the national team as well as the Trinidad and Tobago U20 on 2 September 2021.

See also
List of men's footballers with 100 or more international caps

References

External links
 List of caps Eve won while with Chester City

1972 births
Living people
Trinidad and Tobago footballers
FIFA Century Club
Association football midfielders
English Football League players
Chester City F.C. players
San Juan Jabloteh F.C. players
TT Pro League players
TT Pro League managers
Trinidad and Tobago international footballers
Trinidad and Tobago expatriate footballers
Expatriate footballers in England
Trinidad and Tobago football managers
1996 CONCACAF Gold Cup players
2000 CONCACAF Gold Cup players
2002 CONCACAF Gold Cup players
2005 CONCACAF Gold Cup players
2021 CONCACAF Gold Cup managers
Association football coaches